Charles Winfield was an American politician from New York.

Life
He was a Jacksonian member of the New York State Assembly (Orange Co.) in 1832 and 1834.

Sources
The New York Civil List compiled by Franklin Benjamin Hough (pages 212, 215 and 317; Weed, Parsons and Co., 1858)

People from Orange County, New York
Members of the New York State Assembly
New York (state) Jacksonians
19th-century American politicians
Year of birth missing
Year of death missing